The competition of gymnastics at the 1920 Summer Olympics was held from Monday 23 to Friday 27 August 1920 at the Beerschot Stadium in Antwerp. Four events were contested and only men were allowed to compete.

Medal summary

Participating nations
A total of 250(*) gymnasts from 11 nations competed at the Antwerp Games:
 
 
 (*)
 
 
 
 
 
 
 
 

(*) NOTE: Both amounts are given without the four Danish gymnasts, which are exclusively listed in the IOC medal database.

Medal table

References

Sources
 
 Official report of the 1920 Olympic Games
 De Wael 
 Wudarski
 databaseOlympics
 various books by Kamper/Mallon and others

 
1920 Summer Olympics events
1920
1920 in gymnastics